Jeanne Robert Foster (née, Julia Elizabeth Oliver; March 10, 1879 – September 22, 1970) was an American poet from the Adirondack Mountains.

Biography
Julia Elizabeth Oliver was born in Johnsburg, New York, March 10, 1879.

In 1896, she married Matlock Foster, and lived in Rochester, New York. She studied drama at the Stanhope-Wheatcroft Dramatic School, and worked in magazine journalism. She attended Radcliffe College and Boston University simultaneously as a special student. Professor Charles Townsend Copeland of Harvard was her personal instructor for three years and was a strong influence. She became a leading fashion model. In 1903, she was chosen as the "Harrison Fisher Girl". The couple then moved to Boston; she continued to work as a journalist there and in New York, becoming literary editor of the  American Review of Reviews. In 1913, the year of the Exhibition of Modern Art in New York, she wrote an article  featuring Cézanne, Picasso, Derain, Seurat, and other modernists. This was at a time when defense of modern art brought forth hostile criticism. Through the publicity she received from the article, she became acquainted with John Quinn. Although she would become the dearest friend of Quinn's last years, at this stage she kept her distance because she had been warned Quinn was a dangerous man for a young woman to know.

In 1916, she began to publish narrative verse about the Adirondacks. Her books, "Wild Apples" and "Neighbors of Yesterday", were published in 1916 followed by "Rock Flower". A play "Marthe" won the Drama League prize in 1926. From this period she traveled in Europe, met important figures of modernism, and co-operated with the collector John Quinn in building up his contemporary art collection. In 1922, she accepted the American editorship of the Transatlantic Review published simultaneously in New York and Paris and edited by Ford Madox Ford. After Quinn's death in 1924, Jeanne helped prepare the collection of his letters that became the John Quinn Memorial Collection at the New York Public Library. The collection includes an extensive correspondence with Joseph Conrad.

She loved Maine and spent time at a cottage there with her sister, Mrs. Theodore H. Smith of Detroit. In 1932 she moved to Schenectady, where she worked as a social worker.

Jeanne's friends included many of the period's leading authors and artists. She was particularly close to Ford Madox Ford, Ezra Pound, and William Butler Yeats. She also had a relationship with the English author and occultist Aleister Crowley.

She is buried near her friend John Butler Yeats, the painter and father of William Butler Yeats, in the Chestertown Rural Cemetery in the Adirondacks. Her own papers can be found in the Jeanne R. Foster-William M. Murphy Collection at the New York Public Library and at Harvard University’s Houghton Library, which holds her correspondence with poet and author Ezra Pound.

References

Sources
 Richard and Janis Londraville. Dear Yeats, Dear Pound, Dear Ford: Jeanne Robert Foster and Her Circle of Friends (Syracuse University Press, 2001)

External links
www.northnet.org

1879 births
1970 deaths
Writers from Schenectady, New York
American women poets
20th-century American poets
20th-century American women